Ken or Kenneth Reed may refer to:
Ken Reed (Australian politician) (born 1944), Australian former politician
Ken Reed (Canadian football) (1941–2014), linebacker
Ken Reed (footballer) (1931–2018), Australian rules footballer
Ken Reed (West Virginia politician), member of the West Virginia House of Delegates

See also
Ken Reid (disambiguation)
Ken Read (disambiguation)